Professor Hugh W. Harding FSA FRHS (17 October 1925 – 12 August 2014) was the chief justice of Malta from 1987 to 1990. He was the son of judge William D. Harding.

Selected publications
 History of Roman Law in Malta
 Maltese Legal History under British Rule (1801-1836)

References 

20th-century Maltese judges
Fellows of the Society of Antiquaries of London
Fellows of the Royal Historical Society
1925 births
2014 deaths